The 2017 SAFF U-18 Championship was the 2nd edition of the SAFF U-18 Championship, an international football competition for men's under-18 national teams organized by SAFF. But since most teams use to send their U-18 team keeping in mind 2018 AFC U-19 Championship qualification it has been officially changed to U-18 tournament. The tournament was hosted by Bhutan 18–27 September 2017.

It was the first time that Bhutan was hosting SAFF event.

Host selection
A draw for tournament ceremony was held on 10 July 2017 at conference room of Bangladesh Football Federation.

SAFF general secretary Anwarul Haque Helal and BFF general secretary Abu Nayeem Shohag, were among others present on the occasion.

Player eligibility 
Players born on or after 1 January 1999 are eligible to compete in the tournament.

Participating teams
On 6 September 2017 it was announced that Sri Lanka withdrew from the tournament whereas Pakistan didn't take part due to internal turmoil.

Venue

Match officials

 Referees 
  Abdur Rahman Dhali 
  Ugyen Dorji 
  Pratik Mondal 
  Hussain Sinan
  Laba Khatri 
  Farook M. Irshad

 Assistant Referees 
  Mohammad Shah Alam
  Phurpa Wangchuk 
  Mohan Ravi 
  Karma Yeshi 
  Padam Bahadur Bhujel 
  Sampath Liyanagunawardena

Referee Supervisor 
  Tayeb Hasan Shamsuzzaman

Format 
After Sri Lanka U18 opted out from the event. Now the championship will be played on round robin basis. Each team will face every other team once respectively and the team with the most points will win the title.

Standings 
All matches are played in Thimphu, Bhutan.
Times listed are UTC+06:00.

Winner

Awards
The following awards were given for the 2017 SAFF U-18 Championship.

Goalscorers
 5 Goals

  Jafar Iqbal 

 3 Goals

  Lalawmpuia

 2 Goals

  Orgyen Tshering 
  Princeton Rebello 
  Roman Limbu
  Dinesh Henjan 

 1 Goal 

  Saikot Mahmoud Munna
  Rahmat Mia 
  Mahbubur Rahman
  Edmund Lalrindika
  Asish Rai
  Rejin Subba
  Ahmed Tholal 
  Abhishek Halder 
  Abhishek Rijal 
  Mohammed Al-Amin

References

2017 SAFF U-18 Championship
2017 in Asian football
2016–17 in Nepalese football
2016–17 in Indian football
2017 in Bhutanese football
2017 in Bangladeshi football
2017 in Maldivian football
2017 in youth association football